Sulaimanabad railway station (Urdu and ) is located in Punjab, Pakistan.

See also
 List of railway stations in Pakistan
 Pakistan Railways

References

External links

Railway stations in Attock District
Railway stations on Kotri–Attock Railway Line (ML 2)